"We Are Both from the Same Village" (Sheinu Meoto Hakfar) is a memorial poem written in 1966 by the Israeli composer Naomi Shemer that she set to music in 1969. It tells about the friendship between two friends from the same village, one of whom was killed in battle.

The song is often played on Yom HaZikaron on the radio or live.

Background 
The song commemorates two Israeli soldiers, Zabel And Yosef Regev. Both men in the song, who were born in 1927, worked on the same farm, fought side by side in the 1947–1949 Palestine war, and served in the 101st Moses Dayan Parachute Regiment and the Mossad. Israeli poets have written poems about these two men since 1955. While in Paris in 1964, Shemer learned about the two men and met with Yosef Regev to learn about their comradeship in battle. As a result, she wrote "We Are Both from the Same Village." The poem included a passage in which one of the two men died, and it was published in 1967. The song was first performed at a music festival in 1969.

During the Yom Kippur War, Zabel volunteered to join Ariel Sharon's 143rd Legion, which was fighting in the Sinai Peninsula. When Zabel was killed by an Egyptian Army artillery shell on October 17, 1973, this poem came true.

Influence
In 1993, the Israeli television network on Tuesday chose "We Are Both from the Same Village" as Shemer's second most popular song after "Jerusalem of Gold."
This song was the only one performed at Sharon's state funeral on January 13, 2014.

References

1966 poems
Israeli music
Hebrew-language songs